The Via Argentaria (Latin for the "Silver Way") was a Roman and medieval trade route through the Dinaric Alps. It was named after the Roman silver that was transported between the mint in Salona, the silver mines east of Ilidža and in Srebrenica, and the mint in Sirmium. At the south end, it connected the areas of today's Solin and Split, northeastwards through the Dinaric Alps starting at Klis and Sinj, with central Bosnia, turning northward along the Drina and connecting today's Sremska Mitrovica.

References

Sources
 
 

Trade routes
History of Dalmatia
Medieval Bosnia and Herzegovina
Medieval Serbia
Economy of Serbia in the Middle Ages
Economic history of Croatia
Economy of the Republic of Venice